The Typist (French: Dactylo) is a 1931 French comedy film directed by Wilhelm Thiele and starring Marie Glory, Jean Murat and Armand Bernard. It was a French-language version of the German film Die Privatsekretärin which was itself based on a novel by István Szomaházy. It was followed by a 1934 sequel The Typist Gets Married.

The film's sets were designed by Otto Hunte and Franz Koehn.

Cast
 Marie Glory - Simone Dupré
 Jean Murat - Paul Derval
 Armand Bernard - Jules Fanfarel
 Marie-Antoinette Buzet - La secrétaire
 Jean Boyer - Moreau
 Albert Broquin - Un choriste
 André Michaud - Le garçon de restaurant
 Vony Myriame

Other film versions
 Tales of the Typewriter (December 1916, Hungary, directed by Alexander Korda)
 The Private Secretary (January 1931, Germany, directed by Wilhelm Thiele)
 The Private Secretary (July 1931, Italy, directed by Goffredo Alessandrini)
 Sunshine Susie (December 1931, United Kingdom, directed by Victor Saville)
 The Private Secretary (December 1953, West Germany, directed by Paul Martin)

References

External links

1931 films
1931 comedy-drama films
Films directed by Wilhelm Thiele
1930s French-language films
French multilingual films
Films based on Hungarian novels
Pathé films
French black-and-white films
Films with screenplays by Franz Schulz
French comedy-drama films
1931 multilingual films
1930s French films